Daejeon Samsung Fire Bluefangs is a South Korean professional volleyball team. The team was founded in 1995 and became fully professional in 2005. They are based in Daejeon and are members of the Korea Volleyball Federation (KOVO). Their home arena is Chungmu Gymnasium in Daejeon.

Honours

Domestic 
 Korea Volleyball Super League
 Champions (8): 1997, 1998, 1999, 2000, 2001, 2002, 2003, 2004

V-League
Champions (8): 2005, 2007–08, 2008–09, 2009–10, 2010–11, 2011–12, 2012–13, 2013–14
Runners-up (3): 2005–06, 2006–07, 2014–15

KOVO Cup
Winners (2): 2009, 2018
Runners-up (3): 2006, 2008, 2012

Continental 
AVC Club Volleyball Championship
Champions (2): 2000, 2001
Runners-up: 1999

Season-by-season records

Players

2022−23 team

See also 
 Cheil Worldwide
 Samsung Fire & Marine Insurance

References

External links 

 Official website 

Volleyball clubs established in 1995
Sport in Daejeon
South Korean volleyball clubs
Cheil Worldwide
Samsung Sports
 
1995 establishments in South Korea